Passenham is a small village in the civil parish of Old Stratford  in south-west Northamptonshire, England. It is just north of the River Great Ouse, which forms the boundary with Buckinghamshire, and close to (but separated by the river from) Stony Stratford in Milton Keynes.

The village's name means 'Passa's hemmed-in land'.

Governance
The village parish council is joined with the village of Old Stratford which also administers the village and both are part of West Northamptonshire. It was governed by South Northamptonshire District Council and Northamptonshire County Council until local government changes in 2021.

Landmarks
The church of St Guthlac has a late 13th-century tower, the upper part rebuilt 1626. The chancel was built in 1626 by Sir Robert Banastre (who died in 1649). Some remarkable furnishings, stalls and misericords date from 1626. There are also original wall paintings which were restored in the 1960s. Also notable are box pews, stained glass and a monument to Banastre.

References

External links

Villages in Northamptonshire
Country houses in Northamptonshire
History of Northamptonshire
West Northamptonshire District